The Universidade Paranaense (abbreviated Unipar) is one of the private universities of the State of Paraná, Brazil.

Based in the city of Umuarama, and campuses in the following cities: Cascavel, Cianorte, Francisco Beltrão, Guaíra, Paranavaí and Toledo, all cities located in Paraná State.

References

External links
 Official Unipar Website 

Educational institutions established in 1972
Universities and colleges in Paraná
Cascavel
Toledo, Paraná
Umuarama
Cianorte
1972 establishments in Brazil
Private universities and colleges in Brazil